Keith W. Kintigh is an American anthropologist and professor emeritus at Arizona State University. He specialises in quantitative archaeology and the archaeology of the Southwestern United States, conducting field research on Ancestral Pueblo sites in the Cibola region of New Mexico. He was one of the founders of Digital Antiquity, an organization supporting the long-term preservation of archaeological data, and its data repository the Digital Archaeological Record (tDAR).

Education and career 
Kintigh studied sociology and computer science at Stanford University, graduating in 1974, and received his PhD in anthropology from the University of Michigan in 1982. He worked joined the Department of Anthropology (later School of Human Evolution and Social Change) at Arizona State University in 1987 and served as the head of its Center for Archaeology and Society.

Kintight was the president of the Society for American Archaeology from 1999 to 2001, where he worked on implementing the Native American Graves Protection and Repatriation Act (NAGPRA). He was a Fulbright Scholar at University College Dublin in 2011.

Selected publications

References

External links 

 
 
 
 Tools for Quantitative Archaeology written by Keith Kintigh

Living people
Year of birth missing (living people)
American archaeologists
Stanford University alumni
University of Michigan alumni
University of Arizona faculty